Mara Stransky (born 13 February 1999) is an Australian competitive sailor. She spent her teenage years living permanently onboard the family 50ft catamaran.

Stransky competed at the 2020 Summer Olympics in Tokyo 2021, in Laser Radial. She finished 14th in the field of 44. Detailed results.

In 2022 she won the Australian Sailing Female Sailor of the Year Award after winning the ILCA 6 class at Kiel Week along with top-10 finishes at the World Championships, Hyeres Olympic Week and Allianz World Cup Almere regattas.

References

External links
 
 
 
 

 

1999 births
Living people
Australian female sailors (sport)
Sailors at the 2020 Summer Olympics – Laser Radial
Olympic sailors of Australia
Sportswomen from New South Wales
21st-century Australian women